Dark Metropolis is a 2010 science fiction film with political and spiritual overtones, written and directed by Stewart St. John.  It is the second part of the Creation Wars saga, following The Next Race: The Remote Viewings. Two more sequels are planned.

Plot
Mankind has lost a 300-year war against a genetically enhanced race that man created, abused and finally tortured. Now the descendants of that race - known as the 'Ghen' control the planet Earth from advanced underground cities.

Cast 
 Bailey Chase as Aiden Pryme
 Pamela Clay as Hannalin Pryme
 Kristy Hulslander as the Channeler
 Matt O'Toole as Brother Wikstrom
 Arthur Roberts as Potentate XXXIV
 Eric Scott Woods as Crecilius Pryme
 Mercedes LeAnza as Young Hanalin Pryme

See also

 List of dystopian films

References

External links 
 
 
 
 Dark Metropolis at Video Detective

2010 films
2010s science fiction films
American science fiction films
American dystopian films
Films set in the future
2010s English-language films
2010s American films
English-language science fiction films